The 1971–72 Honduran Liga Nacional season was the 7th edition of the Honduran Liga Nacional.  The format of the tournament remained the same as the previous season.  Club Deportivo Olimpia won the title and qualified to the 1972 CONCACAF Champions' Cup along with runners-up C.D.S. Vida.

1971–72 teams

 Atlético Indio (Tegucigalpa)
 España (San Pedro Sula)
 Lempira (La Lima)
 Marathón (San Pedro Sula)
 Motagua (Tegucigalpa)
 Olimpia (Tegucigalpa)
 Platense (Puerto Cortés)
 Troya (Tegucigalpa, promoted)
 Verdún (Tegucigalpa)
 Vida (La Ceiba)

 Verdún purchased C.D. Atlético Español's franchise.

Regular season

Standings

Top scorer
  Carlos Alvarado (Vida) with 14 goals

Squads

Trivia
 Atlético Español changed its name to Verdún this season.

Known results

Round 1

Fecha 13

Fecha 14

Fecha 15

Fecha 16

Fecha 17

Fecha 18

Fecha 19

Fecha 20

Unknown rounds

References

Liga Nacional de Fútbol Profesional de Honduras seasons
1
Honduras